Hule Mill Farm (Danish: Hule Møllegård) is a watermill situated a few kilometres to the southwest of Ledreborg, in Lejre Municipality, some 30 kilometres west of Copenhagen, Denmark. It was powered by a tributary of Kornerup Å. The building was listed in the Danish registry of protected buildings and places in 1986.

History
Hule Møllegård traces its history back to the beginning of the 18th century. It was originally a three-winged complex but two of the wings have been demolished.

Architecture
The surviving main wing is built in brick with dressed, half-timbered gables. The hip roof is thatched with straw and has several thatched dormer windows.

The stream runs in a pipe under the cobbled yard in front of the building. The site also comprises a ditch and a bridge across the mill pond to the west of the building.

See also
 List of watermills in Denmark

References

External links

 Source

Listed buildings and structures in Lejre Municipality
Watermills in Denmark
Thatched buildings in Denmark